The Toyota TF107 is the car with which the Toyota team competed in the  Formula One season. It was revealed in Cologne on Friday the 12th of January, prior to an exhaustive testing regime. The chassis was designed by Pascal Vasselon, Mark Tatham and Mark Gillan with the engine being designed by Luca Marmorini and Noritoshi Arai overseeing the entire project.

Aerodynamics

The main changes in comparison to its predecessor, the TF106B were aerodynamic. The position of the engine was moved forward by 100 mm, meaning that the chassis tub was shorter. This was achieved by reshaping the monocoque, and did not incur a reduction in size of the fuel tank.

The area below the nose of the car was clear of intrusion from suspension components due to the "zero keel" design. In fact at the front of the car, the monocoque was 30mm higher than on the TF106B, which resulted in dramatically sloped suspension wishbones. Although this approach compromised the front suspension geometry possibilities, the Toyota engineers came to the conclusion that this was not a problem.

Engine and gearbox

Owing to the new homologation rules on engines imposed by the FIA, the engine (called the RVX-07) was based on that used by Jarno Trulli in the 2006 Japanese and Brazilian Grands Prix. Only limited changes from this design were allowed, in order to optimise performance for the 19000 rpm rev limit which was enforced in 2007. Several changes were made to the pistons and valves and other components, although the engine block could not be changed.

In 2007, the WilliamsF1 team used Toyota engines as a customer team. As part of this partnership, Toyota used a new gearbox developed in collaboration with Williams, which used seamless shift technology. Only the gearbox internals were shared with the Williams's 2007 car, the FW29, the TF107's gearbox casing being made by Toyota.

Performance

The car was less successful than the previous year's TF106, which managed 35 points in the season. The TF107's 13 points were amassed with seven points scoring finishes, including two 6th places, one for Jarno Trulli at the 2007 United States Grand Prix and one for Ralf Schumacher in Hungary. Trulli scored points on three other occasions, with Schumacher finishing in the points in two other races. By the end of the season, the team embarrassingly scored less points than WilliamsF1 who have the same engine as them in the Constructors' Championship. Ralf Schumacher did not have his contract renewed. He was replaced by fellow German driver Timo Glock for the 2008 season.

The car's best qualifying position was in the hands of Ralf Schumacher, who took 5th place in Hungary. It made the top ten 20 times out of a possible 34.

Complete Formula One results
(key) (results in bold indicate pole position)

References

External links
 Technical Specification and Detail of TF107

Toyota Formula One cars
2007 Formula One season cars